Gail Robert Bruce (September 29, 1923 – August 23, 1998) was an American football defensive end who played two seasons with the San Francisco 49ers of the All-America Football Conference and National Football League. He was drafted by the Pittsburgh Steelers in the 30th round of the 1946 NFL Draft. He played college football at the University of Washington and attended Puyallup High School in Puyallup, Washington.

References

External links
Just Sports Stats

1923 births
1998 deaths
Players of American football from Washington (state)
American football defensive ends
Washington Huskies football players
San Francisco 49ers players
Sportspeople from Puyallup, Washington